The 1956 Fresno State Bulldogs football team represented Fresno State College—now known as California State University, Fresno—as a member of the California Collegiate Athletic Association (CCAA) during the 1956 NCAA College Division football season. Led by fifth-year head coach Clark Van Galder, Fresno State compiled an overall record of 8–2 with a mark of 2–0 in conference play, placing first in CCAA standings, but no champion was named. The Bulldogs played home games at Ratcliffe Stadium on the campus of Fresno City College in Fresno, California

Schedule

Team players in the NFL/AFL
The following were selected in the 1957 NFL Draft.

The following finished their college career in 1956, were not drafted, but played in the AFL (prior to the merge with the NFL).

Notes

References

Fresno State
Fresno State Bulldogs football seasons
Fresno State Bulldogs football